The marsupium or brood pouch, is a characteristic feature of Peracarida, including the orders Amphipoda, Isopoda, Cladocera, and Cumacea. It is an egg chamber formed by oostegites, which are appendages that are attached to the coxae (first segment) of the first pereiopods. Females lay their eggs directly into the brood chamber, and the young will develop there, undergoing several moults before emerging as miniature adults referred to as mancae. Males have no marsupium.

References

Crustacean anatomy